Lione/Conti is a collaborative album by Italian power metal singers Fabio Lione (Angra, Turilli / Lione Rhapsody, ex-Rhapsody of Fire, ex-Vision Divine, ex-Labyrinth) and Alessandro Conti (Trick or Treat, Luca Turilli's Rhapsody) under the moniker Lione/Conti. It was released through Frontiers Records on 26 January 2018 (one source says 18 January.). The project was conceived by Frontiers's president Serafino Perugino, who was willing to create an Italian version of the label's Allen/Lande partnership. The album was written and produced by Simone Mularoni (DGM).

Track listing

Personnel
Fabio Lione - lead vocals
 Alessandro Conti - lead vocals
 Simone Mularoni - guitars, bass
 Filippo Martignano - keyboards
 Marco Lanciotti - drums

Sources:

Critical reception 

Writing for Metal Hammer Italia, Dario Cattaneo praised the album's overall quality, but criticized it for sounding too similar to bands such as Kamelot and DGM itself instead of the bombastic symphonic epic metal the two vocalists are more associated with.

References

2018 debut albums
Frontiers Records albums
Vocal duet albums